Devanthakudu is a 1960 Indian Telugu-language fantasy comedy film directed and produced by C. Pullayya. The film stars N. T. Rama Rao and Krishna Kumari, with K. V. S. Sarma, S. V. Ranga Rao, Kanta Rao, Kalyanam Raghuramayya, Peketi Sivaram, P. Hemalatha and Mohana in supporting roles.

Devanthakudu is a remake of the 1958 Bengali film Jamalaye Jibanta Manush, itself based on a play with the same title by Dinabandhu Mitra, one of the top Bengali dramatists of the nineteenth century. Devanthakudu was simultaneously filmed with its Tamil version Naan Kanda Sorgam with a largely different cast. The film released on 7 July 1960 and became a commercial success.

Plot 

Sundaram is a stage actor. He falls in love with Meenakshi, the daughter of a miserly rich man Bhadrayya who dislikes Sundaram. Bhadrayya fixes his daughter's marriage with an aged billionaire over his wife's protests. Meenakshi and Sundaram marry in secret with the help of his friends. Bhadrayya enters with his goons and drags his daughter home while his goons brutally assault Sundaram. Meenakshi jumps into a river to commit suicide. Crestfallen, Sundaram repents that he was responsible for her death.

While Sundaram sleeps on a veranda, Yama's men, unable to find the address of a dead man, take Sundaram instead with them to hell, the abode of Yama. Sundaram finds his bull there and by unleashing it on Yama, he occupies his throne, promotes Vichitragupta, rewrites Yamaloka's constitution, and also takes the opportunity to search for Meenakshi with the help of Narada, who takes him to Vaikuntha, the abode of Vishnu and Lakshmi, and to Indraloka, the heaven where he finds Meenakshi. With Vishnu and Lakshmi's blessings, Meenakshi is brought to life and Sundar, and the two return to Earth. Bhadrayya relents and accepts Sundar as his son-in-law.

Cast 
 N. T. Rama Rao as Sundaram
 Krishna Kumari as Meenakshi
 K. V. S. Sarma as Bhadrayya
 S. V. Ranga Rao as Yama
 Kanta Rao as Vishnu
 Kalyanam Raghuramayya as Narada
 Peketi Sivaram as Vichitragupta
 P. Hemalatha as Bhadrayya's wife
 Mohana as Lakshmi

Production

Development 
After the success of the Telugu film Pakka Inti Ammayi (1953), which was based on the Bengali film Pasher Bari (1952), its director C. Pullayya waited for five years to adapt another comical Bengali story for Telugu-speaking audiences. The Bengali fantasy comedy Jamalaye Jibanta Manush (1958) was running successfully in cinemas in Bengal. Its screenplay, written by Gour Shee, incorporated satirical attacks on contemporary life and social issues. Pullayya established the production company Bhargavi Films with Ch. Subbarao, a Madras-based building contractor, as managing director and himself as producer, and bought the rights to remake Jamalaye Jibanta Manush in Telugu and Tamil languages. The Telugu version was titled Devanthakudu and the Tamil version was titled Naan Kanda Sorgam. Adurthi Narasimha Murthy was the screenwriter of Devanthakudu, and the dialogues were written by Vempati Sadasivabrahmam. Cinematography was handled by A. Shanmugam and the editing by T. R. Srinivasulu while A. Krishnarao served as art director.

Casting and filming 
N. T. Rama Rao was cast as the male lead Sundaram and Krishna Kumari as the female lead Meenakshi. S. V. Ranga Rao, who played Yama in Sati Savitri (1957), reprised his role in Devanthakudu. Kalyanam Raghuramayya played Narada in addition to working as playback singer. The Tamil version featured a largely different cast, with only Ranga Rao mutual to both. In the Tamil version Naan Kanda Sorgam, Krishna Kumari's elder sister Sowcar Janaki played Meenakshi.

Devanthakudu and Naan Kanda Sorgam were filmed simultaneously, with scenes from the former being filmed first and those from the latter second. Because of a belief that if Rama Rao wore multiple different get-ups the film would succeed, he sported two additional disguises for this film: that of a woman, and that of an elderly dance teacher. Though a couple of dialogues from the Yama durbar were borrowed from the Bengali version, Sadasivabrahmam largely followed his own diktat and wrote apt and appealing dialogues reflecting the lifestyle and societal problems of the 1960s. The final cut of Devanthakudu was 17 reels, longer than the Bengali original which was 13 reels.

Soundtrack 
The soundtrack was composed by G. Aswatthama, and the lyrics were written by Aarudra. The songs "Go Go Go Gongura" and "Entha Madhura" attained popularity, as did the various shlokas and poems narrated by Ghantasala and Raghuramayya.

Release and reception 
Devanthakudu was released on 7 July 1960. The film was commercially successful. Some critics of the time wrote that the Bengali story was copied from the 1934 American film, Death Takes a Holiday. But Mitra wrote the play Jamalaye Jibanto Manush before his death in 1873.

Legacy 
Devanthakudu became a trendsetter for "socio-fantasy films" in Telugu cinema. The film inspired N. T. Rama Rao's own Yamagola (1977). S. S. Rajamouli mentioned in an interview that the basic plot of his film Yamadonga (2007) was inspired by Devanthakudu and Yamagola.

References

External links 
 

1960 films
1960s fantasy comedy films
1960s Telugu-language films
Films directed by C. Pullayya
Indian fantasy comedy films
Telugu remakes of Bengali films
Yama in popular culture